"Boogie Grass Band" is a song written by Ronnie Reno, and recorded by American country music artist Conway Twitty.  It was released in July 1978 as the first single from his album Conway.  The song peaked at number 2 on the Billboard Hot Country Singles chart. It also reached number 1 on the RPM Country Tracks chart in Canada.

Chart performance

References

1978 singles
1978 songs
Conway Twitty songs
Song recordings produced by Owen Bradley
MCA Records singles